Coatbridge and Chryston (Gaelic: Coatbridge agus Chryston) is a constituency of the Scottish Parliament covering part of the council area of North Lanarkshire. It elects one Member of the Scottish Parliament (MSP) by the plurality (first past the post) method of election. It is also one of nine constituencies in the Central Scotland electoral region, which elects seven additional members, in addition to nine constituency MSPs, to produce a form of proportional representation for the region as a whole.

The seat has been held by Fulton MacGregor of the Scottish National Party since the 2016 Scottish Parliament election.

Electoral region 

The other eight constituencies of the Central Scotland region are Airdrie and Shotts, Cumbernauld and Kilsyth, East Kilbride, Falkirk East, Falkirk West, Hamilton, Larkhall and Stonehouse, Motherwell and Wishaw and Uddingston and Bellshill.

The region covers all of the Falkirk council area, all of the North Lanarkshire council area and part of the South Lanarkshire council area.

Constituency boundaries and council areas 

The  constituency was created at the same time as the Scottish Parliament, in 1999, with the name and boundaries of an  existing Westminster constituency. In 2005, however, Scottish Westminster (House of Commons) constituencies were mostly replaced with new constituencies.

The Holyrood constituency is one of four covering the North Lanarkshire council area, the others being Airdrie and Shotts, Cumbernauld and Kilsyth, and Motherwell and Wishaw; Uddingston and Bellshill spans parts of both North and South Lanarkshire. All five are within the Central Scotland electoral region.

Following the Boundary Review the electoral wards used in the creation of Coatbridge and Chryston are:

In full: Coatbridge North, Coatbridge South, Coatbridge West, Gartcosh, Glenboig and Moodiesburn, Stepps, Chryston and Muirhead

Member of the Scottish Parliament

Election results

2020s

2010s

2000s

1990s

Notes

External links

Constituencies of the Scottish Parliament
1999 establishments in Scotland
Constituencies established in 1999
Scottish Parliament constituencies and regions 1999–2011
Scottish Parliament constituencies and regions from 2011
Coatbridge
Politics of North Lanarkshire